Bell Peak is a peak,  high, surmounting a southeast trending spur of the Herbert Range, just southwest of Sargent Glacier. The peak was probably observed by Roald Amundsen's south polar party in 1911, and was later roughly mapped by the Byrd Antarctic Expedition, 1928–30. It was named by the Advisory Committee on Antarctic Names for G. Grant Bell who studied cosmic rays at McMurdo Station, winter party 1962.

References
 

Mountains of the Ross Dependency
Amundsen Coast